Ahrensborg Claussen (20 June 1895 – 4 July 1967) was a Danish cyclist. He competed at the 1920 and the 1924 Summer Olympics.

References

External links
 

1895 births
1967 deaths
Danish male cyclists
Olympic cyclists of Denmark
Cyclists at the 1920 Summer Olympics
Cyclists at the 1924 Summer Olympics
Sportspeople from Frederiksberg